Hristo Atanasov was a Bulgarian revolutionary, a worker of the Internal Macedonian-Adrianople Revolutionary Organization (IMARO).

Biography

Hristo Atanasov was born in the village of Dikanya, Radomir region, in 1877. After he finished elementary school, he worked in Sofia, where he became a member of the revolutionary organization IMARO. In 1904, he went to the region of Veles as a member of the revolutionary band of Ivan Naumov Alyabaka. He was a freedom fighter until the end of 1904, and later at the beginning of 1907, he became a leader for the Bitola revolutionary region. He was active in the agricultural villages of Pelagonia. In December 1907, he was captured, sentenced to death and hanged in March 1908 in Bitola.

References

1877 births
1908 deaths
People from Pernik Province
Bulgarian revolutionaries
Executed revolutionaries
Members of the Internal Macedonian Revolutionary Organization
Executed Bulgarian people
People executed by the Ottoman Empire by hanging
20th-century executions by the Ottoman Empire